Lord Bank is a submarine bank in the Bellingshausen Sea with a least depth of  lying west-southwest of the entrance to Quest Channel, Adelaide Island, Antarctica.

References

Undersea banks of the Southern Ocean
Landforms of Graham Land
Landforms of Adelaide Island